Josef Winterhalder the Elder (10 January 1702, Vöhrenbach – 25 December 1769, Vienna) was a German sculptor. His brothers, Anton (1699–1758) and Johann, also became sculptors.

Biography
After an apprenticeship with his father, the sculptor , he spent a brief time in Munich then, from 1728 to 1730, completed his studies at the Academy of Fine Arts, Vienna, where he was taught by Paul Troger, among others. He then went to Dresden, to study the works of Balthasar Permoser. Between 1730 and 1732, he and his brothers worked at the Hradisko Monastery and at the pilgrimage church in Svatý Kopeček (today part of Olomouc). He and Anton remained in Moravia when Johann returned home in 1733.  

In 1736, he was one of three sculptors chosen to create the decorations on the ramp of the Dominican church in Brno.

In 1747, records indicate that he created four stucco altars for the monastery church at Uherský Brod. Sometime in the early 1750s, he moved to Znojmo. In 1753, when Johann's wife Maria died, Josef adopted three of their children, including Josef; now known as "The Younger" to distinguish him from his uncle. 

His last known work was in 1761, when he submitted a design for the high altar at St. Thomas Church in Brno. The final work was actually executed by the sculptor, Jakob Schertz. Some later drawings have also been preserved.

Sources 
 
 
 Edmund Wilhelm Braun: "Winterhalder, Josef I". In: Hans Vollmer (Ed.): Allgemeines Lexikon der Bildenden Künstler von der Antike bis zur Gegenwart, Vol.36: Wilhelmy–Zyzywi. E. A. Seemann, Leipzig 1947, pp.84–86
 Josef Matzke: Olmützer Bildhauer der Barockzeit. Quellenverlag V. Diwisch, Steinheim/Main 1973.
Lubomír Slaviček (Hrsg.): Josef Winterhalder der Jüngere (1743 Vöhrenbach – 1807 Znojmo), Maulbertschs bester Schüler. Museum Langenargen am Bodensee, Langenargen 2009.

External links

1702 births
1769 deaths
German sculptors
Academy of Fine Arts Vienna alumni
Religious sculptures
People from Schwarzwald-Baar-Kreis